Operation Fillmore was an operation conducted by the 1st Brigade, 101st Airborne Division in Phú Yên Province, lasting from 26 March to 21 July 1966.

Prelude
Operation Fillmore was a continuation of the harvest security operations of Operation Harrison.

Operation
The 1st Battalion, 327th Infantry Regiment was retained as a reserve force at Tuy Hoa Air Base, while the 2/327th Infantry and the 2nd Battalion, 502nd Infantry Regiment patrolled the rice-growing plains and the western foothills.

In early April, 2/502nd Infantry was rotated to Tuy Hoa Air Base and 1/327th and 2/327th began a block and sweep operation in the mountains northwest of Tuy Hòa. On 7 April a company from 1/327th engaged an entrenched company-sized force, killing 28 defenders.

Given that the PAVN had apparently withdrawn from the Tuy Hòa Valley, on 9 April 1/327th and 2/502nd were redeployed, leaving only the 2/327th Infantry to continue operations.

Aftermath
Operation Fillmore officially concluded on 21 July, the US claimed PAVN losses were 134 killed and 35 captured, U.S. losses were 8 killed.

References

Conflicts in 1966
1966 in Vietnam
Battles involving the United States
Battles involving Vietnam
Battles and operations of the Vietnam War in 1966
History of Phú Yên Province